Weitzmann or Weitzman is a surname, a variant of Weizmann. Notable people with the surname include:

Weitzmann 
Carl Borromäus Weitzmann (1767–1828), German jurist, and Swabian dialect poet
Carl Friedrich Weitzmann (1808–1880), German music theorist
Moisés Teitelboim, from Ukraine ∞ Sara Volosky, from Bessarabia
Volodia (Valentín) Teitelboim (Volosky) ∞  Raquel Weitzmann
Claudio Bunster, born: Claudio Bunster Teitelboim Weitzman(n), Chilean scientist
Jacques Julien Weitzmann
Kurt Weitzmann (1904–1993), German-American art historian, studied Byzantine and medieval art
Marc Weitzmann

Weitzman 
Daniel Maddy-Weitzman (born 1986), Israeli baseball pitcher
David Weitzman (1898–1987), Jewish British politician
Howard Weitzman,  American trial lawyer
Idan Weitzman (born 1985), Israeli footballer
Martin Weitzman (1942–2019) Professor of Economics at Harvard University
Matt Weitzman, American producer and write, one of the creators of American Dad!
Michael Weitzman, American pediatrician
Rick Weitzman (Richard L. Weitzman) (born 1946), American basketball player
Stanley Howard Weitzman (1927-2017), American ichthyologist, Smithsonian Institution
Stuart Weitzman (born 1942), American fashion designer
Yehoshua Weitzman (born 1949, Tel-Aviv)

Wajcman 
Judy Wajcman, sociologist

See also 
Weizmann
Weismann

References 

German-language surnames
Jewish surnames